Han Min-yong (born 19 July 1989) is a South Korean journalist. She is currently the anchor for the weekend edition of JTBC Newsroom.

Biography 
Han graduated from high school in Beijing, China. She received her bachelor's degree in arts and economics in Peking University. She also finished a master's degree in finance at City University of New York.

Han started her career in 2013 as a reporter in MBN covering the police, local prosecution and law until she joined JTBC in 2017. In JTBC, she was a part of the legal team. Han became a trending topic on Naver after successfully reporting a piece about Kim Kwan-jin being in custody.

Han succeeded Lee Ji-eun as sub-anchor in the weekend edition of JTBC Newsroom, starting on 3 August 2018, just less than a year after joining the network. She then ascended to main anchor on 10 January 2020 after Kim Pil-kyu left his position to become the new head of the political team. This makes her only the second female to become main anchor of a JTBC newscast, the first sole female anchor of a JTBC flagship newscast, and one of only two female anchors of a news or current affairs program in the network. She also hosts the segment Open Mic, where she goes out to conduct field reports and interviews.

She was previously a member of the network's legal and political team, and is currently a member of the weekend coverage team.

Han plays the piano.

Han did a cameo as an anchor in the JTBC News-produced short film Starting Line made in light of the 2020 South Korean legislative elections.

Career

Journalism

Film

References

External links 

 JTBC reporter information
 Instagram

South Korean journalists
South Korean women journalists
1989 births
Living people
JTBC people